T24 or T-24 may refer to:

Weapons and armour 
 T-24 tank, a Soviet medium tank
 T24 Light Tank, an American prototype tank
 T24 machine gun, an American machine gun
 T24 (rocket), an American rocket design

Rail and transit 
 Kitachō Station, in Takamatsu, Kagawa, Japan
 Tanimachi Rokuchōme Station, in Chūō-ku, Osaka, Japan
 WEG T 24, a German railbus

Other uses 
 T24 (newspaper), a Turkish news site
 T-24 (tiger)
 California Building Standards Code, Title 24 of the California Code of Regulations
 Cooper T24, a racing car